Banyeo Agricultural Market Station is a station of the Busan Metro Line 4 in Seokdae-dong, Haeundae District, Busan, South Korea. The station name comes from the nearby Banyeo Agricultural Products Wholesale Market.

It is the last underground station  before proceed the next elevated station named Seokdae.

Station Layout

Gallery

External links

  Cyber station information from Busan Transportation Corporation

Busan Metro stations
Haeundae District
Railway stations opened in 2011